Huskvarna Church is a wooden church in Huskvarna in Sweden. Belonging to Huskvarna Parish of the Church of Sweden, it was opened in June 1910.

References

External links

20th-century Church of Sweden church buildings
Churches completed in 1910
Wooden churches in Sweden
Huskvarna
Churches in Jönköping Municipality
Churches in the Diocese of Växjö
1910 establishments in Sweden